Far East Global Group was first established in 1969 in Hong Kong as a small workshop and the business was incorporated in 1977 as Far East Aluminium Works Company Limited. Through years of growth and expansion, the workshop has been transformed from a small aluminium windows contractor into a multi-national enterprise. In 1991, the then newly incorporated holding company, Far East Aluminium (Holdings) Limited (“FEAHL”), successfully went public and became a listed company in Hong Kong.

Internationally, Far East Global Group has been hired as the key exterior facade contractor in various countries including, United Arab Emirates, United States, Canada, Chile, Singapore, Macau and China.

In April 2008, Far East Aluminum has officially been renamed as Far East Group Limited.

In December 2009, Far East Group Limited officially changed its name to Far East Global Group Limited.

History
 In May 1999, China National Aero-Technology Import & Export Corporation acquired a controlling interest in the Previously Named Far East Aluminum Works and became the controlling shareholder. In August of the same year, FEAHL was renamed to CATIC International Holdings Limited (“CATIC”).

In late 2007, Showmost Group Limited, a company jointly owned by Lotus China Fund II L.P. (“Lotus”) and Starflash Investment Limited, obtained the entire equity interests in FEA Holdings Limited (“FEA”), the immediate holding company of all operating companies within the then FEAHL for the facade and cladding engineering businesses, and FEA ceased to be a subsidiary of CATIC.

In March 2010, Far East Global Group successfully went public and became a listed company in Hong Kong (HK.0830).

In March 2012, Far East Global Group became a member of China State Construction International Holdings.

Key Management
Far East Global Group consists of several key Directors and senior Management who manage the entire operations of Far East Global Group

This Includes:
Dr. Cheong Chit Sun, Jackson - Chief Executive Officer
Mr. Chan Sim Wang, Vincent - Chief Financial Officer
Mr. Wang Hai, Harry - Chief Operation Officer
Mr. Ho Wai Man, Raymond - President of Asia Pacific Division
Mr. Elliot Kracko - President of North America Division
Mr. Qu Baocheng, Patrick - President of PRC Division
Mr. Edward Boyle - Vice President of Asia Pacific Division
Mr. Jim Mitchell - Vice President of North America Division
Mr. Li Xuguang, Sunny - Vice President of PRC Division
Mr. Mok Wai Him, Jim - Project Director
Mr. Lau Sai Ying, Alan - Marketing Director

Key Projects
Burj Khalifa
Cosmopolitan of Las Vegas, Las Vegas
The Venetian Macau
International Finance Centre, Shanghai

Current Developments
Kai Tak Cruise Terminal, Hong Kong
New York Police Academy, New York
Shangri-La, Toronto
Marina Bay Sands, Singapore
University of Montreal Hospital Centre (CHUM), Montreal
Constanera Center, Chile
Upper West Side T2, Melbourne

References

External links
Far East Global Group

Construction and civil engineering companies of Hong Kong